Oliveira de Azeméis is a city and a municipality located in Porto Metropolitan Area in Portugal. Administratively, the municipality belongs to the District of Aveiro. The population of the municipality in 2011 was 68,611, in an area of 161.10 km2. The city itself has a population of about 20,000. Oliveira de Azeméis is located 35 km to the south of Porto. It is less than 20 km far from the Atlantic Ocean. The municipal holiday is the Monday that follows the 2nd Sunday of August.

Facilities
Local facilities include:
 Hospital de São Miguel
 Higher education schools
 Secondary schools
 Basic schools
 Regional museum
 Hotel
 Post Office
 Police station
 Clinic centres
 Tourism office
 Library - Biblioteca Municipal Ferreira de Castro

Economy
It is an important industrial center, producing a wide variety of goods such as injection moulds, dairy produce, shoes, car components, steel tubes and other steel materials (Ferpinta), cookware (Silampos and CELAR), springs and mattresses. Among its most well-known companies are Simoldes and Lactogal.

Transportation
It has connection by the following motorways: A1, A29 and A32; and the IC2 expressway. It is served by Francisco Sá Carneiro Airport/Oporto's airport.

Sports
Its most prominent sports club is the União Desportiva Oliveirense (U.D.O.) which fields teams in football, basketball and ring hockey as well as an affiliated cycling team that holds a UCI Continental team licence, the Kelly–Simoldes–UDO (UCI team code: KSU). One other club is Futebol Clube Pinheirense (FCP), it is a club dedicated mostly to football. They have a kids school in partnership with Benfica from Lisbon.

Demographics

Parishes
Administratively, the municipality is divided into 12 civil parishes (freguesias):
 Carregosa
 Cesar
 Fajões
 Loureiro
 Macieira de Sarnes
 Nogueira do Cravo e Pindelo
 Oliveira de Azeméis, Santiago de Riba-Ul, Ul, Macinhata da Seixa e Madail
 Ossela
 Pinheiro da Bemposta, Travanca e Palmaz
 São Martinho da Gândara
 São Roque
 Vila de Cucujães

Cities and towns
There is one city in the municipality: Oliveira de Azeméis. The towns are
 Carregosa
 Cesar
 Fajões
 Loureiro
 Nogueira do Cravo
 Pinheiro da Bemposta
 Vila Chã de São Roque
 Vila de Cucujães

Marian sanctuary
In the centre there is a Marian sanctuary, La-Salette. It was built in order to honor the apparitions of Virgin Mary in the small village of La Salette, Isère, in France. The sanctuary contains the finger of a burglar that tried to steal some precious artifacts (one night a guard shot a burglar with his shotgun and only hit his finger). The finger lies inside an alcohol jar right in front of the chapel.

Notable people 

 Abel Pêra (1891 in Carregosa – 1975) a Portuguese actor based in Brazil.
 Manuel Pêra (1894 in Carregosa – 1967) a Portuguese actor based in Brazil.
 Ferreira de Castro (1898–1974) a Portuguese social realist writer and journalist. 
 Julieta Gandra (1917–2007) a doctor, imprisoned for supporting the Angolan War of Independence
 Carlos da Silva Costa (born 1949) an economist, Governor of the Bank of Portugal, 2010-2020

Sport 
 Adelino Teixeira (born 1952) a Portuguese retired footballer with 322 club caps and 12 for Portugal 
 Bruno Neves (1981–2008) a Portuguese professional road racing cyclist
 Cátia Azevedo (born 1994) a Portuguese 400 metres sprinter, competed in the 2016 Summer Olympics

References

External links
Town Hall official website

 
Municipalities of Aveiro District